was a Japanese farmer and soldier who became famous for his actions in the First Sino-Japanese War. Some sources record his given name with the spelling .

Biography
In 1888, he passed the standard conscription examination and was assigned to the 18th Infantry Regiment based in Toyohashi.

In 1894, the Sino-Japanese War broke out, and Jūkichi was called up to participate in the Battle of Pyongyang. On September 15, the order was given to attack Pyongyang in full force, and his regiment approached the heavily fortified .

The Japanese force tasked with assaulting the gate found itself outnumbered and immobilized by Chinese suppression fire. Jūkichi was selected as one of a 13-member forlorn hope charged with climbing the walls. Once inside, Jūkichi and his team were engaged by numerous Chinese warriors. Fending them off, Jūkichi himself opened the Hyeonmu Gate and thereby admitted the Japanese into the city. Pyongyang quickly fell as the Chinese forces within the city routed.

Jūkichi's activities became known in Japan through various forms of media including newspapers and popular songs. At the time, he was regarded as a national hero.

In 1895, at the end of the war, Jūkichi returned home and soon found himself in debt. In order to pay off his debts, he cooperated with a showman in Nagoya who staged performances of the battle of the Hyeonmu Gate. The play was well received in many places, and there even appeared another show featuring a different person impersonating Jūkichi. After he finished paying off his debts, he quit acting and went back to farming. In 1904, he was called up to fight in the Russo-Japanese War, and returned to Japan in 1905.

Returning to his hometown, Jūkichi devoted the remainder of his life to agriculture. He developed his own fertilizer based on rice hull ash and managed to double the harvest of rice and wheat. For this, he received commendations from the governor of Aichi Prefecture and the prefectural agricultural association in 1923 and 1924. He died in 1938 at the age of 69.

References 

1868 births
1938 deaths
Japanese soldiers
Imperial Japanese Army personnel